The Vietnam Open is a tennis tournament held annually in Ho Chi Minh City, Vietnam, since 2015. The event is part of the ATP Challenger Tour and is played on outdoor hard courts. For sponsorship reasons, the tournament was called Vietnam Open presented by Bia Saigon Special in 2015 and Vietnam Open presented by Vietravel in 2016. In 2017 the tournament was sponsored by local real estate developer Hung Thinh Corporation. In January 2019, the Vietnam Open will be hosted for the first time in Da Nang City. The tournament is managed by Sports Marketing Company STREAM Vietnam and directed by International Sports Agent Mr Longy Le Hoang.

Past finals

Singles

Doubles

External links 
ITF Search